Winton is a ghost town in Sweetwater County, Wyoming, United States. Winton is sometimes referred to as Megeath. Megeath Coal Company owned a Post Office named Winton. Union Pacific bought out Megeath and changed the name to Winton.

Notable people
Lawrence Welsh, the fourth Bishop of the Roman Catholic Diocese of Spokane, was born in Winton.

References

Geography of Sweetwater County, Wyoming
Ghost towns in Wyoming